The  was a professional wrestling tag team championship owned by the Wrestle-1 (W-1) promotion. The title was announced on September 22, 2014, in conjunction with the start of a tournament to crown the first Wrestle-1 Champion. In Japanese the title's name includes the katakana term for "championship", derived from the English language instead of the more common kanji term .

Like most professional wrestling championships, the title is won as a result of a scripted match. There have been eighteen reigns shared among sixteen teams and twenty one wrestlers.

History

Championship tournament
On September 22, 2014, during the second day of a tournament to determine the inaugural Wrestle-1 Champion, it was announced that Wrestle-1 would also be introducing its own tag team championship. Through Wrestle-1's relationship with American promotion Total Nonstop Action Wrestling (TNA), the promotion had previously presented a match for the TNA World Tag Team Championship. The first Wrestle-1 Tag Team Champions would be crowned in the "First Tag League Greatest" round-robin tournament taking place between November 15 and 30, 2014. The two blocks containing the ten participating teams were revealed on November 3. The teams were later given official team names on November 14. In the tournament, a win was worth two points, a draw one point and a loss zero points. The top two teams from each block advanced to the semifinals and the winners wrestled in the tournament final to determine the inaugural champions. On November 27, Seiki Yoshioka pulled out of the tournament with a knee injury, forcing his team to forfeit their final match in the tournament. On November 30, Team 246 (Kaz Hayashi and Shuji Kondo) defeated the new Wild order (Akira and Manabu Soya) in the finals to win the tournament and become the inaugural Wrestle-1 Tag Team Champions.

Title history

Combined reigns

By team

By wrestler

See also
World Tag Team Championship (AJPW)
IWGP World Tag Team Championship
GHC Tag Team Championship
NWA Intercontinental Tag Team Championship

References

External links
Official title history at W-1.co.jp 
Title history at Wrestling-Titles.com

Wrestle-1 championships
Tag team wrestling championships